Notagonum anceps is a species of ground beetle in the subfamily Platyninae. It was described by Jedlicka in 1934.

References

Notagonum
Beetles described in 1934